Valdelagua del Cerro is a municipality located in the province of Soria, Castile and León, Spain.  , it has 20 inhabitants.

References

Municipalities in the Province of Soria